Boryza is a genus of moths of the family Noctuidae.

Species
Boryza aeraria Schaus, 1912
Boryza commiscens Walker, 1858

References
Natural History Museum Lepidoptera genus database

Calpinae